The Homes Association was established on 15 January 2009. The organization is a public interest group in the consumer field, lobbying and fighting for the rights, protection and prosperity of Icelandic households.

The association is built on a foundation of democracy where the members have equal rights to influence. The association's board members are elected democratically and the objectives of interest are chosen democratically at annual assemblies. It operates on a national level with the possibility of starting local groups in any region, provided they follow the statutes and procedures of the association.

The association's main objective is to provide the public with a way to collectively protect the common interests of Icelandic households, to be a unified voice and advocate in the national dialogue on household interests, both short term and long term.

In the short term the main objective is to address urgently the impact made by the financial crisis on households, and prevent households from becoming victims of unfair and possibly illegal confiscation of property as well as unsustainable debt and social disintegration.

Among the organization's key objectives are corrections of mortgage capital indexed to inflation or foreign currencies, a reasonable interest rate environment, and sharing of risk and responsibility between borrowers and lenders.

External links
 The Homes Association website (english section)

Housing in Iceland

References